Bárbara atómica is a 1952 Argentine film. Directed by Julio Saraceni and script written by Abel Santa Cruz based on Michel Duran's play, "Barbara Bow". It was released on May 23, 1952.

Cast
Juan Carlos Thorry
Blanquita Amaro
Adolfo Stray
Ubaldo Martínez
Lalo Maura
Ramón J. Garay
María Esther Duckse
Guido Gorgatti

References

External links
 

1952 films
1950s romantic musical films
1950s Spanish-language films
Argentine black-and-white films
Argentine romantic musical films
Films directed by Julio Saraceni
1950s Argentine films